Keysville Railroad Station is a historic railway station located at Keysville, Charlotte County, Virginia.  It was built by the Richmond and Danville Railroad in stages between 1890 and 1900, and is a one-story, vernacular frame railroad building.  It contains offices and segregated waiting rooms at the north end and a large freight area extending to the south with docks on three sides.  It remained in use as a passenger station until 1956.  The Keysville Railroad Station appeared as the stations in Eastport, Maine, and in Warm Springs, Georgia, in the filming of Eleanor and Franklin, a television film about the Roosevelts that would earn 11 Emmy awards (1976).

It was listed on the National Register of Historic Places in 2008.

References

Stations along Southern Railway lines in the United States
Railway stations on the National Register of Historic Places in Virginia
Railway stations in the United States opened in 1900

Railway stations closed in 1956
Buildings and structures in Charlotte County, Virginia
National Register of Historic Places in Charlotte County, Virginia